Cosmic is a Czech Science fiction sitcom. It is about Czech flight to the Moon which was to be funded by money from the European Union. The money was tunnelled but the flitght must still happen due to impending fine.

It was broadcast in fall of 2016 on Czech Television. First three episodes were already shown on 25 and 30 July 2016 at the Summer Film School and during September at Bio Oko in Prague and the Scala cinema in Brno. It was also presented as part of the International Film Festival in Karlovy Vary.

It was nominated for the Czech Lion in the Best Drama Series category.

Cast
 Martin Myšička as minister Lubor Šnajdr
 David Novotný as technician Karel Cikán
 Jiří Hána as Libor Repelent
 Jakub Žáček as astrophysician René Hejl
 Jana Plodková as captain Milada Musilová
 Petr Vančura as second pilot Petr Chromý
 Eva Josefíková as Miss Kurník Agáta Kašpárková
 Václav Kopta as space program director Ing. Milan Sumec
 Martin Dejdar as Anton Hrabiš
 Lenka Krobotová as Dona Drobková
 Marie Ludvíková as cook Filoména

Episodes
 Sumec nemá kníry
 Česká škola
 Smrt docenta
 Řekl někdo kočička?
 Triumf

External links
Website (in Czech)
IMDb.com

References 

Czech comedy television series
Czech science fiction television series
2016 Czech television series debuts
Czech Television original programming